is a 2003 Japanese kaiju film directed by Masaaki Tezuka, written by Tezuka and Masahiro Yokotani, and produced by Shogo Tomiyama. Produced and distributed by Toho Studios, it is the 28th film in the Godzilla franchise, the fifth film in the franchise's Millennium series, the 27th Godzilla film produced by Toho, and a direct sequel to the 2002 film Godzilla Against Mechagodzilla. The film features the fictional monster characters Godzilla and Mothra, along with the mecha character Mechagodzilla, who is referred to in the film by the name Kiryu.

Godzilla: Tokyo S.O.S. stars Noboru Kaneko, Miho Yoshioka, Mitsuki Koga, Masami Nagasawa, Chihiro Otsuka, Kou Takasugi, Hiroshi Koizumi, and Akira Nakao, with Tsutomu Kitagawa as Godzilla and Motokuni Nakagawa as Kiryu. It is the only installment in the franchise's Millennium period to share continuity with a previous Godzilla film besides the original 1954 film and also shares connections with Mothra. In Japan, it was followed by Godzilla: Final Wars, which was released on December 4, 2004.

Plot
In 2004, Kiryu undergoes repair and modifications after its battle with Godzilla one year earlier. However, the Shobijin warn the Japanese government that Godzilla continues returning to the country because they used the original Godzilla's skeleton in Kiryu's construction. If they return the bones to the sea, Mothra will take Kiryu's place in defending Japan. Due to Mothra attacking Japan in 1961, Prime Minister Hayato Igarashi refuses, but agrees to discontinue Kiryu once it kills Godzilla. Godzilla and Mothra fight, but the former has the upper hand. With the repairs finished, Kiryu joins the fray, but Godzilla knocks both it and Mothra out.

Meanwhile, on Infant Island, twin Mothra larvae hatch from Mothra's egg and rush to help their mother. As lead scientist Yoshito Chujo heads in to repair Kiryu from its internal backup cockpit, the Japan Xenomorph Self-Defense Forces (JXSDF) and larvae try to hold Godzilla off, but Mothra sacrifices herself to protect the latter from Godzilla's atomic breath. Concurrently, Yoshito finishes repairing Kiryu, allowing it to weaken Godzilla. As the larvae bind Godzilla in silk and Kiryu's remote pilot, Kyosuke Akiba, receives the order to destroy Godzilla, Kiryu's spirit is reawakened by Godzilla's roar. The cyborg lifts Godzilla, uses its boosters to carry them both out to sea, and turns over to let Chujo escape before it plunges into the ocean.

In a post-credits scene, an undisclosed laboratory is shown with canisters containing the DNA of numerous kaiju. In the Japanese version, an unidentified voice announces that a "bio-formation" experiment involving an "extinct subject" is about to take place.

Cast

Production

Writing
Toho had commissioned four story outlines for director Tezuka to choose from. Tezuka found them all boring, so instead he wrote a new story outline overnight and submitted it to the studio, which they eventually approved.

Reception
Box office

Godzilla: Tokyo S.O.S. opened on 14 December 2003 on a double bill with the animated feature Hamtaro: Ham Ham Grand Prix. In its opening weekend, it was third place at the box office with $1,686,009 (U.S).

Critical response

Godzilla: Tokyo S.O.S. has received generally positive reviews from journalistic reviewers upon its release on DVD. John Sinnott of DVD Talk gave Tokyo S.O.S. four stars out of five, saying:

Giving the film a score of three out of five, Stomp Tokyo said "the plot is fairly simplistic and the character relationships are painted in broad strokes," but added that the movie "[features] the best monster action Toho has produced." Joseph Savitski of Beyond Hollywood criticized the film's "uninspired script," which he wrote had "ideas [that] are never fully developed," but added that the film is "well-made" and "mak[es] for an entertaining 91 minutes." Mark Zimmer of Digitally Obsessed gave Tokyo S.O.S. a "B" score, calling it "a fun enough action film with enough explosions and destruction of Tokyo to satisfy die-hards and casual fans alike."

Home media
The film was released on DVD by Columbia/Tristar Home Entertainment on 14 December 2004.  It included a "Making Of - Featurette for Special Effects."  It is also available in a 3-Disc "50th Anniversary Godzilla DVD Collection" box set; along with Son of Godzilla [1967] and Godzilla vs. Mechagodzilla [1974].

The film was released on blu-ray on the Toho Godzilla Collection on 6 May 2014 in a 2-Disc double feature with Godzilla: Final Wars. It included a "Making of" documentary.

Notes

References

External links

2003 films
2000s monster movies
2003 science fiction films
Science fiction crossover films
Crossover tokusatsu films
Films directed by Masaaki Tezuka
Films set in 2004
Films set in Tokyo
Films set in Nagano Prefecture
Films set in Hawaii
Films set in the Pacific Ocean
Films set on fictional islands
Giant monster films
Godzilla films
2000s Japanese-language films
Japanese science fiction films
Japanese sequel films
Kaiju films
Mothra
Japanese robot films
Submarine films
Toho films
Films scored by Michiru Ōshima
2000s Japanese films